Paniyaram is an Indian dish made by steaming batter using a mould. It is named variously paddu, guliyappa, yeriyappa, gundponglu, Kuḻi paniyaram, ponganalu, gunta, or Tulu: appadadde, appe . The batter is made of black lentils and rice and is similar in composition to the batter used to make idli and dosa. The dish can also be made spicy or sweet with chillies or jaggery respectively. Paniyaram is made on a special pan that comes with multiple small indentations.

Gallery

See also
Æbleskiver, a Danish sweet dish
Mont lin maya, a Burmese dish
Khanom khrok, a Thai dish
Pinyaram, an Indonesian dish
Poffertjes, a Dutch sweet dish
Takoyaki, a Japanese dish

References

External links

Video of the making of kuḻi paniyaram – Wikimedia Commons

Indian rice dishes
Fermented foods
Tamil cuisine
Kerala cuisine